"Angel One" is the fourteenth episode of the first season of the American science fiction television series Star Trek: The Next Generation. It was first broadcast on January 25, 1988, in the United States in broadcast syndication. It was written by Patrick Barry and was directed by Michael Ray Rhodes.

Set in the 24th century, the series follows the adventures of the Starfleet crew of the Federation starship Enterprise-D. In this episode, an away team visits a world dominated by women to search for survivors of a downed freighter, while the crew of the Enterprise suffer from the effects of a debilitating virus.

The episode was intended to be commentary on Apartheid in South Africa, using gender role reversal. However, there were problems between the cast and director during filming, and Patrick Stewart sought to have the sexist nature of the episode changed. The resulting episode was not well liked by members of the production team, and the response from reviewers was negative.

Plot 
The Enterprise arrives at the planet Angel One, which is ruled by an oligarchy of women. The ship is looking for survivors from the shipwrecked freighter Odin, seven-plus years after having been evacuated. The freighter was missing three escape pods and the only planet in range was Angel One. An away team consisting of Commander William Riker (Jonathan Frakes), Lt. Commander Data (Brent Spiner), Lt. Tasha Yar (Denise Crosby), and Counselor Deanna Troi (Marina Sirtis) beam down to the surface. They attempt to negotiate with Beata (Karen Montgomery), the "Elected One" of the native inhabitants, to let them search for the survivors. Time is of the essence however, as the Enterprise must travel to a Federation outpost near the Romulan Neutral Zone (where a group of Romulan Battlecruisers has been detected) as soon as they resolve their investigation into the Odin survivors.

Beata reveals that they are aware of four male survivors of the Odin who have caused disruption in their society, and are considered fugitives. Beata requests Riker stay with her (and later requests that he order Troi, Data, and Yar to track down the survivors' camp and their leader Ramsey (Sam Hennings), while staying and dining with her). After some back and forth, Data concludes Ramsey and the survivors of the Odin would have platinum with them, and Angel One is naturally devoid of platinum, allowing the Enterprise to easily detect them. Meanwhile, Riker dresses in the garb given to him for his dinner with Beata, Troi and Yar tease him for dressing in clothes that sexualize him and in some ways demean him; Riker only doing so to win favor with Beata. He insists he's only honoring the local customs, acknowledges Beata's beauty and claims to find the loose, revealing garb rather comfortable.

The Enterprise searches while in orbit around Angel One. Doctor Beverly Crusher (Gates McFadden) relieves Captain Jean-Luc Picard (Patrick Stewart) of duty after he and most of the crew have fallen ill to a random virus on board, one which emits a scent detected by its victims at time of infection. The Captain leaves Lieutenant Geordi La Forge (LeVar Burton) in command (Geordi's first time in acting command of a starship). Shortly after they find Ramsey, transmit his location to the Away Team who beam directly to his location.

When confronted by Data, Yar, and Troi with rescue, Ramsey and his men having taken wives and started families during the intervening seven years, refuse to leave. Geordi informs Yar of the medical situation on board, that more Romulan ships have been detected near the Neutral Zone. Riker learns from Beata that their social structure had already started collapsing, though Ramsey and his men have served to accelerate its decline. Riker argues that it may just be the course of evolution taking place. On the Enterprise, systems are becoming harder to maintain with more crew succumbing to the virus. Geordi (after a friendly reminder from a sniffling Worf (Michael Dorn)) remembers that in command, he must delegate tasks so as to remain on the bridge. Dr. Crusher finds that the virus is an airborne organism that produces a sweet aroma to entice inhalation, after which it becomes viral once inside the body.

Riker gets up to date with the situation, then decides that while Ramsey and his group are at large and refusing to leave the planet, there is little they can do. Before leaving, they find that one of Beata's assistants, Ariel (Patricia McPherson), was secretly married to Ramsey. Ariel was followed by Beata's guards to their camp, where they arrested the survivors and their families. The Away Team attempt to explain to Beata the reason for Ramsey's refusal to leave. Beata and her council reject his reasoning and threatens to execute them the following day. After failing to convince Ramsey and his group to leave with them, Riker contacts the Enterprise in hopes of transporting Ramsey and his group without their consent (despite it being a violation of the Prime Directive, and almost certainly an end to his career), but Dr. Crusher (while treating an incapacitated Geordi in the Captain's chair) refuses to allow anyone to beam aboard for fear of them getting infected, but allows Data, an android, to return. Riker orders Data to take command and get the Enterprise to the Neutral Zone before it's too late.

The following morning the Away Team is invited to witness the execution of Ramsey and his followers. Moments after Riker rejects their invitation, Data makes contact and informs them that there is a 48-minute window in which Dr. Crusher has to find a cure and Riker must defuse the situation on the planet, before the ship must leave for the Neutral Zone. On the planet, Ramsey and his men are prepared to be executed by disintegration despite Ariel's pleas, while Dr. Crusher discovers a cure for the virus. Riker is prepared to have the away team and the Odin survivors beamed to the Enterprise, then attempts to dissuade Beata, stating their execution is only bound to create martyrs which would only worsen her situation. Beata reconsiders, then announces that she will stay the execution but Ramsey, his men, their families, and any others that support them, are to be banished to the far side of the planet. She explains that their banishment will not stop the fall of the oligarchy, but will slow it down enough that Beata will not be around to see its end. She then compliments Riker on his wisdom, a surprise to her for a mere male.

The away team return to the ship and Picard, already recovering from the virus but hardly having a voice, orders the ship to the Neutral Zone at high warp.

Production
Producer Herbert Wright explained that the episode was to be a commentary on Apartheid in South Africa, with men on the planet representing black people. The original plot by Patrick Barry would have seen Riker and Data travel to the surface with an otherwise all female away team, which offended the planet's leader to the extent that Yar stuns him with a phaser as a show of strength in order to prevent his immediate execution. Riker is imprisoned as one of the marooned men, named Lucas Jones, begins an uprising. Jones is killed, but his death inspires his followers to assault the government. In that version, Picard is the only one to fall ill on board the Enterprise. The reverse role society had already been included in Gene Roddenberry's 1974 TV pilot/movie Planet Earth, and Wright described it as "being done a thousand times already". In her book Sexual Generations: "Star Trek, the Next Generation" and Gender (University of Illinois Press, 1999), Robin Roberts points out that a similar plot was used by Walter Besant in his 1882 anti-feminist dystopia, The Revolt of Man. "Angel One" featured the first TNG mention of the Romulans, who would appear later in the season one finale, "The Neutral Zone".

Michael Ray Rhodes directed the episode as part of a deal with The Bronx Zoo, another television show filmed at Paramount Studios. Rhodes had previously won Emmy Awards on four occasions for his work on the television series Insights between 1981 and 1984. Wil Wheaton later recalled that there were some issues between the main cast and the director, but that he did not know what they were about as he only worked for one day of the shoot. Gates McFadden described it as "one of the most sexist episodes we ever had", and Patrick Stewart sought to have the episode changed to reduce those elements. Some of the production crew subsequently thought poorly of "Angel One". Executive producer Maurice Hurley described it as "Terrible. Just terrible. One of the ones you'd just as soon erase". Producer Herbert Wright felt that the "sexual places it was dragged to were absurd".

Reception
"Angel One" first aired in the United States in broadcast syndication on January 25, 1988. It received an 11.4 rating, meaning that it was seen by 11.4 percent of all households. This was an increase from the previous week's "Datalore" which received a rating of 10.3.

Several reviewers re-watched the episode following the end of the series. Keith DeCandido of Tor.com described the episode as being "one of the most sexist episodes of Star Trek ever produced under the veneer of feminism", and that the virus subplot was "filler, and boring filler at that". He said that it was "one of the absolute low points of the show", giving it a score of two out of ten. Cast member Wil Wheaton watched it for AOL TV, and thought that it started well but soon descended into the appearance of an episode from The Original Series with Riker in the Kirk role. He also noted that if the speech that Riker gave towards the end of the episode had been given to Yar or Troi then the overall message would have been more subtle. He gave it a grade of D overall.

James Hunt for Den of Geek said that the episode was not as bad as "Code of Honor", but that it contained "almost every terrible cliché seen in TNG first season in one episode". He summed up, "We've seen all of this before, and it was barely interesting the first time around. The second time, it's just tedious. A horrible episode on so many levels." Zack Handlen of The A.V. Club said that he was not sure what the reversal of gender roles in the episode was meant to achieve. He described the virus subplot as "absurd" and gave the episode an F grade.

The episode was included in several worst episode lists, including in one compiled by Scott Thrill for Wired magazine, and it was ranked the fourth worst episode by Jay Garmon at the website TechRepublic. In 2019, Screen Rant ranked "Angel One" among the top 10 worst Star Trek episodes based on IMDb rankings. They also ranked it the fourth worst episode of Star Trek: The Next Generation based on IMDB ratings, which was 5.7 out of 10 at that time.

Home media release
The first home media release of "Angel One" was on VHS cassette, appearing on August 26, 1992, in the United States and Canada. The episode was later included on the Star Trek: The Next Generation season one DVD box set, released in March 2002, and then released as part of the season one Blu-ray set on July 24, 2012.

Notes

References

External links

 

1988 American television episodes
Fictional matriarchies
Gender role reversal
Star Trek: The Next Generation (season 1) episodes
Television episodes about sexism